Le due duchesse, ossia La caccia dei lupi is an 1814 opera in 2 acts, a dramma semiserio per musica, by Johann Simon Mayr to a libretto by Felice Romani after Edgar ou La chasse aux loups by Louis-Charles Caigniez premiered 7 November 1814 Milan, Teatro alla Scala. The plot is based on a French melodrama set in Saxon England during the reign of King Edgar the Peaceful.

Recordings
 Le due duchesse, ossia La caccia dei lupi 2CD Franz Hauk Naxos

References

Operas
1814 operas
Operas by Simon Mayr
Italian-language operas